Symmerista canicosta, the red-humped oakworm moth,  is a species of moth of the family Notodontidae. It is found from southern Canada to North Carolina, South Carolina and Mississippi.

The wingspan is about 35 mm. There is one generation per year, although there might be two generations per year in the south.

The larvae feed on Fagus, Castanea and Quercus species. They are gregarious. They have a bright orange head and black, yellow, orange and white pinstriping. The body is yellowish. Full-grown larvae drop to the ground in late September and pupate between rolled leaves in the litter. Some may overwinter as prepupal larvae.

Gallery

References

Moths described in 1946
Notodontidae
Moths of North America